Clare is an unincorporated community in Johnson County, Kansas, United States, and part of the Kansas City metropolitan area.

History
Clare was located on the Atchison, Topeka and Santa Fe Railway.

References

Further reading

External links
 Johnson County maps: Current, Historic, KDOT

Unincorporated communities in Johnson County, Kansas
Unincorporated communities in Kansas